Dominica competed at the 2011 Pan American Games in Guadalajara, Mexico from October 14 to 30, 2011. Dominica competed with five athletes in two sports: athletics and boxing.

Medalists

Athletics

Men

Track and road events

Field events

Women

Field events

Boxing

Dominica has received a wildcard to send one male boxer.

Men

References

Nations at the 2011 Pan American Games
P
2011